The theca externa is the outer layer of the theca folliculi. It is derived from connective tissue, the cells resembling fibroblasts, and contains  abundant collagen. During ovulation, the surge in luteinizing hormone increases cAMP which increases progesterone and PGF2α production. The PGF2α induces the contraction of the smooth muscle cells of the theca externa, increasing intrafollicular pressure. This aids in rupture of the mature oocyte, or immature oocyte at the germinal vesicle stage in the canine, along with plasmin and collagenase degradation of the follicle wall.

References

External links
 
  - "Mammal, canine ovary (LM, High)"
  - "Mammal, bovine ovary (LM, Medium)"
  - externa
 
 Slide at trinity.edu

Mammal female reproductive system